Pecotox Air is a charter airline based in Chişinău, Moldova.

History
It started operations in November 2001 and operated passenger and freight charter services from its base at Chişinău International Airport.

In June 2007, it was announced that the Republic of Moldova had withdrawn the certificate of the airline, as it was not subject to an appropriate safety oversight, and the European Commission's Air Safety Commission in addition banned the airline from flying within the European Union. The airline has since resumed operations in mid-2016 using two Airbus A300 cargo aircraft. However, as of early 2017 both of those aircraft had been retired again.

Afghanistan helicopter downing
In July 2009, a Pecotox Air Mi-26 was shot down in Helmand province with the loss of six Ukrainian crew members. The aircraft was said to be on a humanitarian mission under NATO contract.

Fleet

Current fleet
As of July 2020, there are no operational aircraft listed for Pecotox Air.

Previously operated
The Pecotox Air fleet previously included the following aircraft:

2 Airbus A300-600RF
4 Antonov An-24RV
2 Antonov An-26B
1 Antonov An-32B
2 Yakovlev Yak-42

References

External links

Official website

Airlines of Moldova
Airlines established in 2001
Airlines disestablished in 2007
Airlines established in 2016